Sonja Sigurđardóttir (born 28 January 1990) is an Icelandic female breaststroke, freestyle and medley para swimmer. She competed at the Paralympics for the first time in 2008 and again she was eligible to compete at the Rio Paralympics.

Career 
She started her Para swimming career in 1997 and she also made her debut at the International level in 2004.

She made her debut at the Paralympics in 2008. In 2016, she was awarded the Best Sportswoman of the Year by the Icelandic Sports Association by the Disabled.

References

External links 
 Sigurđardóttir Sonja
 Sigurđardóttir Sonja

1990 births
Living people
Sonja Sigurdardottir
Sonja Sigurdardottir
Sonja Sigurdardottir
Swimmers at the 2008 Summer Paralympics
Swimmers at the 2016 Summer Paralympics
Sonja Sigurdardottir
S4-classified Paralympic swimmers
21st-century Icelandic women